KBYS (88.3 FM) is a radio station licensed to Lake Charles, Louisiana. The station is owned by McNeese State University, and airs a community radio format.

The station was assigned the KBYS call letters by the Federal Communications Commission on June 15, 2011.

References

External links
 Official Website
 FCC Public Inspection File for KBYS
 

Radio stations in Louisiana
Radio stations established in 2014
2014 establishments in Louisiana
Community radio stations in the United States
College radio stations in Louisiana
Calcasieu Parish, Louisiana